Mount McKercher is a mountain,  high, standing at the east side of Scott Glacier, just north of the mouth of Griffith Glacier, in the Queen Maud Mountains of Antarctica. It was discovered in December 1934 by the Byrd Antarctic Expedition geological party under Quin Blackburn, and named for Hazel McKercher, secretary to Rear Admiral Byrd during the period of this expedition.

References

Mountains of the Ross Dependency
Amundsen Coast